José Jorge Fernandes do Amaral, best known as Zeca Amaral is a former manager of the Angolan national team, a job he took up in October 2010 following the resignation of Hervé Renard.

In 2017, he signed in for F.C. Bravos do Maquis and renewed for another season.

References

Living people
Angolan football managers
Angola national football team managers
1967 births